Aaron Jacob Trent (born February 26, 1986 in Fort Stewart, Georgia) is an American Paralympic Cyclist specializing in track racing.

Cycling

2009
In July 2009 Trent won the 1 km Time Trial at USAC Para-Cycling Track National Championships in Los Angeles.

In November 2009 he represented the United States at the UCI Para-Cycling Track World Championships in Manchester, England.  His first race of the event was the Kilo.  After a mechanical mishap and a restart, he won the Silver Medal in the CP4 category.  Trent won the Bronze Medal in the 4 km Individual Pursuit.  He also raced the mixed disability Team Sprint with Jennifer Schuble and Sam Kavanaugh and placed fourth.

2010
A restructuring of the disability categories saw Trent move from the CP4 classification to the C5 group in 2010.
Trent became a member of the US Olympic Training Center residency program in Colorado Springs, CO in 2010 so he could train full-time.
Together with teammates Will Chesebro and Sam Kavanaugh, he won the Team Sprint at USAC Para-Cycling Track National Championships in Colorado Springs.  Trent will represent the United States at the next UCI Para-Cycling World Championships (dates TBA).

2016
Aaron Trent ventured into the wilderness on his bike planning on putting in an easy 1006.37 miles up the Appalachian Trail. His plans changed when his bike took a wild turn into bear country and he decided to pick a fight with Smokey himself. Aaron won the fight Leonardo style but not without losing his right pinky toe. He is still able to cycle but will have to live with the knowledge of knowing the wildfire spokesperson will have his pinky toe as a spoil of war.

Disability 
Trent suffered a stroke at the age of 4 months after having a severe allergic reaction to antibiotics.  The resultant neurological damage caused spastic hemiplegic cerebral palsy in his left limbs.  In order to compete he has modified his bicycle so all shifting and braking functions are controlled by the dominant hand.

Results

2009
1st  ParaCycling Track National Championships Kilo

2nd  UCI ParaCycling Track World Championships Kilo CP4

2nd  ParaCycling Track National Championships Individual Pursuit

3rd  UCI ParaCycling Track World Championships Individual Pursuit CP4

4th UCI ParaCycling Track World Championships Team Sprint

2010
1st  ParaCycling Track National Championships Team Sprint

References

On two wheels and determination, thestate.com, December 1, 2009

External links
Official site
Aaron Trent on Twitter

Paralympic cyclists of the United States
1986 births
Living people
American track cyclists
American male cyclists